Gadolinium acetate is the acetate salt of the lanthanide element gadolinium, with the chemical formula Gd(CH3COO)3. It is a colorless crystal that is soluble in water and can form a hydrate. Its tetrahydrate has ground state ferromagnetism.

Preparation 

The tetrahydrate of gadolinium acetate can be crystallized from aqueous solution by reaction of gadolinium oxide and acetic acid:

 Gd2O3 + 6 HOAc + 5 H2O → [(Gd(OAc)3(H2O)2)2]·4H2O

Properties 

The complex [Gd4(CH3COO)4(acac)8(H2O)4] can be obtained by the reflux reaction of gadolinium acetate and acetylacetone in the presence of triethylamine in methanol solution.

References 

Gadolinium compounds
Acetates